Shree Bhawani Higher Secondary School is a government school in Palungtar Municipality, Gorkha District, Nepal. It serves as the high school for the area. The school was founded in 1957.

Secondary schools in Nepal
Educational institutions established in 1957
1957 establishments in Nepal
Buildings and structures in Gorkha District